The 1971 Orange Bowl was the 37th edition of the college football bowl game, played at the Orange Bowl in Miami, Florida, on Friday, January 1. Part of the 1970–71 bowl season, it matched the third-ranked Nebraska Cornhuskers, champions of the Big Eight Conference, and the #5 LSU Tigers, champions of the Southeastern Conference (SEC).

An LSU victory would likely have given Notre Dame the national title.

Ahead early, Nebraska rallied in the fourth quarter to win 17–12.

Teams

LSU

Nebraska

Game summary
Paul Rogers kicked a 25-yard field goal for Nebraska to take an early lead. Joe Orduna scored on a three-yard touchdown run, as Nebraska extended its lead to 10–0.

In the third quarter, Lumpkin added a 25-yard field goal to make  On the final play of the third quarter, Buddy Lee threw a 31-yard touchdown pass to Lance Chaffee to put LSU ahead 12–10. The Huskers then drove 67 yards and quarterback Jerry Tagge scored from a yard out with 8:50 remaining; it was the game's last scoring play and gave Nebraska the

Scoring
First quarter
Nebraska – Paul Rogers 26-yard field goal, 2:40
Nebraska – Joe Orduna 3-yard run (Rogers kick), 2:06
Second quarter
LSU – Mark Lumpkin 36-yard field goal, 0:49 
Third quarter
LSU – Lumpkin 25-yard field goal, 11:49
LSU – Lance Chaffee 31-yard pass from Buddy Lee (kick failed), 0:00
Fourth quarter
Nebraska – Jerry Tagge 1-yard run (Rogers kick), 8:50

Statistics
{| class=wikitable style="text-align:center"
! Statistics !! LSU  !! Nebraska
|-
|align=left|First Downs ||20 ||18
|-
|align=left|Rushes–yards ||45–51 ||48–132
|-
|align=left|Passing yards ||227|| 161
|-
|align=left|Passes (C–A–I)|| 17–32–1 || 14–28–2
|-
|align=left|Total Offense ||77–278||76–293
|-
|align=left|Return yards ||3||3
|-
|align=left|Fumbles–lost ||4–3 ||4–3
|-
|align=left|Turnovers|| 4 || 5
|-
|align=left|Punts–average ||8–32.5||6–37.7
|-
|align=left|Yards penalized ||4–27||8–67 
|}

National champions
Undefeated Nebraska (11–0–1) was named national champion in the final AP poll, released after the bowls   With the narrow defeat, LSU (9–3) fell only two spots, from fifth to seventh, its last top-10 finish until finishing fifth in 1987.  The UPI coaches poll was released in early December (before the bowls) through the 1973 season; it had Texas as first, as it did not consider their 24–11 loss to Notre Dame—which defeated LSU 3–0 at South Bend in November—in the Cotton Bowl on New Year's Day.

Cigarette advertising
In April 1970, Congress passed the Public Health Cigarette Smoking Act banning the advertising of cigarettes on television and radio; in order to allow the New Year's Day football games to keep their already-sold cigarette ads, the prohibition was set to begin on at midnight Eastern Standard Time January 2, 1971. Airing in prime time on the East Coast, the 1971 Orange Bowl thus became the last televised sporting event to carry cigarette ads, the final one (for Winston) airing at 10:54 p.m. (The last tobacco advertisement on network TV, for Virginia Slims, was shown at 11:59 p.m. during a break on The Tonight Show).

Future meetings
The teams next met in the 1975 season opener at Lincoln, with the Cornhuskers prevailing 10–7. In the 1976 season opener at Baton Rouge, the top-ranked Cornhuskers escaped with a 6–6 tie after LSU's Mike Conway missed a 44-yard field goal in the closing seconds.

Nebraska won three bowl meetings vs. LSU in the 1980s: the 1983 Orange Bowl, 1985 Sugar Bowl and 1987 Sugar Bowl.

Video
You Tube - 1971 Orange Bowl - NBC telecast

References

Orange Bowl
Orange Bowl
LSU Tigers football bowl games
Nebraska Cornhuskers football bowl games
Orange Bowl, 1971
January 1971 sports events in the United States